The 1995 King Fahd Cup Final was a football match to determine the winners of the 1995 King Fahd Cup. The match was held at King Fahd II Stadium, Riyadh, Saudi Arabia, on 13 January 1995 and was contested by Denmark and Argentina. Denmark won the match 2–0.

Match details

References 
Match report

Final
King Fahd Cup Final
King Fahd Cup Final
1995
Denmark national football team matches
Argentina national football team matches
January 1995 sports events in Asia